Time Cracks is an Australian animated television series created by David Gurney and produced by the Tasmanian animation studio Blue Rocket. The series features three characters who travel through time to report on notable events in history. The cartoon screened on ABC in Australia from 2004 and has a duration of three minutes.

The characters are Emily the echidna, Milo the dog, and 58 the sheep, they are journalists who work for a second-rate time travel magazine. Using an unreliable time travel prototype device, our heroes exploit cracks in time and journey back into history in search of out-of-date news. But they have some problems. Their time travel machine is a modified hot-dog van with a mind of its own. It can always be guaranteed to take the reporters somewhere unexpected.

References

Australian Broadcasting Corporation original programming
Australian children's animated television series
2004 Australian television series debuts
2004 Australian television series endings
2000s Australian animated television series